Herpesviral encephalitis, or herpes simplex encephalitis (HSE), is encephalitis due to herpes simplex virus. It is estimated to affect at least 1 in 500,000 individuals per year, and some studies suggest an incidence rate of 5.9 cases per 100,000 live births.

About 90% of cases of herpes encephalitis are caused by herpes simplex virus-1 (HSV-1), the same virus that causes cold sores. According to a 2006 estimate, 57% of American adults were infected with HSV-1, which is spread through droplets, casual contact and sometimes sexual contact, though most infected people never have cold sores. The rest of cases are due to HSV-2, which is typically spread through sexual contact and is the cause of genital herpes.

Two-thirds of HSE cases occur in individuals already seropositive for HSV-1, few of whom (only 10%) have history of recurrent orofacial herpes, while about one third of cases results from an initial infection by HSV-1, predominantly occurring in individuals under the age of 18. Approximately half of individuals who develop HSE are over 50 years of age.

Signs and symptoms
Most individuals with HSE show a decrease in their level of consciousness and an altered mental state presenting as confusion, and changes in personality. Increased numbers of white blood cells can be found in patient's cerebrospinal fluid, without the presence of pathogenic bacteria and fungi. Patients typically have a fever and may have seizures. The electrical activity of the brain changes as the disease progresses, first showing abnormalities in one temporal lobe of the brain, which spread to the other temporal lobe 7–10 days later. Imaging by CT or MRI shows characteristic changes in the temporal lobes (see Figure).

Definite diagnosis requires testing of the cerebrospinal fluid (CSF) by a lumbar puncture (spinal tap) for presence of the virus. The testing takes several days to perform, and patients with suspected Herpes encephalitis should be treated with acyclovir immediately while waiting for test results. Atypical stroke-like presentation of HSV encephalitis has been described as well and the clinicians should be aware that HSV encephalitis can mimic a stroke.

Associated conditions 
Herpesviral encephalitis can serve as a trigger of anti-NMDA receptor encephalitis. About 30% of HSE patients develop this secondary immunologic reaction, which is associated with impaired neurocognitive recovery.

Epidemiology 
The annual incidence of herpesvial encephalitis is from 2 to 4 cases per 1 million population.

Pathophysiology
HSE is thought to be caused by the transmission of virus from a peripheral site on the face following HSV-1 reactivation, along a nerve axon, to the brain. The virus lies dormant in the ganglion of the trigeminal cranial nerve, but the reason for reactivation, and its pathway to gain access to the brain, remains unclear, though changes in the immune system caused by stress clearly play a role in animal models of the disease. The olfactory nerve may also be involved in HSE, which may explain its predilection for the temporal lobes of the brain, as the olfactory nerve sends branches there. In horses, a single-nucleotide polymorphism is sufficient to allow the virus to cause neurological disease; but no similar mechanism has been found in humans.

Diagnosis
Brain CT scan (with/without contrast). Complete prior to lumbar puncture to exclude significantly increased ICP, obstructive hydrocephalus, mass effect

Brain MRI—Increased T2 signal intensity in frontotemporal region → viral (HSV) encephalitis

Treatment
Herpesviral encephalitis can be treated with high-dose intravenous acyclovir, which should be infused 10 mg/kg(adult) over 1 hour to avoid kidney failure. Without treatment, HSE results in rapid death in approximately 70% of cases; survivors suffer severe neurological damage. When treated, HSE is still fatal in one-third of cases, and causes serious long-term neurological damage in over half of survivors. Twenty percent of treated patients recover with minor damage. Only a small population of untreated survivors (2.5%) regain completely normal brain function. Many amnesic cases in the scientific literature have etiologies involving HSE.

Earlier treatment (within 48 hours of symptom onset) improves the chances of a good recovery. Rarely, treated individuals can have relapse of infection weeks to months later. There is evidence that aberrant inflammation triggered by herpes simplex can result in granulomatous inflammation in the brain, which responds to steroids. While the herpes virus can be spread, encephalitis itself is not infectious. Other viruses can cause similar symptoms of encephalitis, though usually milder (Herpesvirus 6, varicella zoster virus, Epstein-Barr, cytomegalovirus, coxsackievirus, etc.).

References

External links 

 
 
 

Viral encephalitis
Pediatrics
Herpes simplex virus–associated diseases